Eloor Lending Library is a chain of privately owned public libraries. It was established in 1979 in Ernakulam District of Kerala State. Now it has three branches in India including the one in Ernakulam.

This library is different from other conventional lending libraries, as they charge 10% of the cost of book as reading fee from members.

Branches

 Trivandrum (1986)
 Bangalore (1988)

References

Public libraries in India
Libraries in Ernakulam
Libraries established in 1979